Enoch Louis Lowe (August 10, 1820August 23, 1892) was the 29th Governor of Maryland in the United States from 1851 to 1854.

Early life
He was the only child of Bradley Samuel Adams Lowe and Adelaide Bellumeau de la Vincendiere. He was born on August 10, 1820, in the manor-house of The Hermitage, on the Monocacy River, Frederick County, Maryland. At thirteen he entered Clongowes Wood College, Ireland, where he was schoolmates with Thomas Francis Meagher. Three years later he matriculated at Stonyhurst College, England, where he was friends with Francis Mahony and Miles Gerard Keon, the novelist. He graduated first in his class in 1839.

Studying with Judge John A. Lynch, of Frederick, he was admitted to the bar in 1842.

Family
In 1844, Lowe married Esther Winder Polk, of Somerset County, Maryland, who was a relative of James Knox Polk. They had eleven children of whom seven survived: Adelaide Victoire, married E. Austin Jenkins; Anna Maria, religiense of the Sacred Heart, died 1889; Paul Emelius; Vivian Polk; Victoire Vincendiere, married John M. Stubbs; Enoch Louis; Esther Polk; Mary Gorter, married Francis de Sales Jenkins.

Political career
Lowe was a member of the Maryland House of Delegates in 1845, a member of the Democratic National Convention in 1856 and a U.S. Presidential elector in 1860. Lowe took the oath of office as Governor of Maryland on January 6, 1851. The most important events of his administration were the adoption of the Maryland Constitution of 1851, the completion of the Baltimore and Ohio Railroad to the Ohio River and a reduction of the state tax rate from 25 to 15 cents on a $100.

As of 2022, he is the last governor of Maryland to have lived in Frederick County.

Civil War and later life
He supported the Confederacy during the Civil War. During the war, he lived at Richmond, Virginia, and Milledgeville, Georgia.  After the war, he moved to Brooklyn, New York, joining the law firm of Richard F. Clarke and W. H. Morgan.

He is mentioned in the song "Maryland, My Maryland", which later became the state anthem.

He died at St. Mary's Hospital, Brooklyn, on August 23, 1892. He is buried at Saint John's Cemetery in Frederick, Maryland.

Assessment

James McSherry, Chief Judge of the Court of Appeals of Maryland, writing to a member of his family, paid this tribute to Lowe's memory:
The superb attainments of your father as a forensic and popular orator were perhaps never equalled by anyone who ever lived in this country.

References

External links
 
Esther Winder Polk Lowe, (painting), Smithsonian Art database
Lowe Family Papers,  MS. 1949, Maryland Historical Society, Library of Maryland History

Democratic Party governors of Maryland
Democratic Party members of the Maryland House of Delegates
1820 births
1892 deaths
People educated at Stonyhurst College
People educated at Clongowes Wood College
19th-century American politicians
People from Frederick County, Maryland
Saint John's Catholic Prep (Maryland) alumni